The Professional Golfers' Association of America (PGA of America) is an American organization of golf professionals that was founded in 1916. Consisting of nearly 29,000 men and women members, the PGA of America's undertaking is to establish and elevate the standards of the profession and to grow interest and participation in the game of golf.

In 1968, the PGA Tour was spun off from the PGA of America as a separate organization to administer professional golf tours. However, the PGA of America still directly conducts several tournaments, including the PGA Championship, the Senior PGA Championship, and the Women's PGA Championship.

On December 4, 2018, the PGA of America announced plans to relocate its headquarters from Palm Beach Gardens, Florida, to a planned 600-acre mixed-use development in Frisco, Texas. The Frisco site has two golf courses: Fields Ranch East and Fields Ranch West.

History
The Professional Golfers' Association of America was established on April 10, 1916, but the genesis of the first all-professional golf body in the United States was sparked by a luncheon on January 17, 1916, hosted by Rodman Wanamaker at Wanamaker's Store on Ninth Street and Broadway in New York City. Sixty attendees were invited by the Taplow Club, which was a business group within Wanamaker's Store and led by professional Tom McNamara of Brookline, Massachusetts, an outstanding player and talented salesman who was keenly aware of the welfare of the club professional. McNamara pressed upon Wanamaker that it was prime time to bring U.S. professionals together, and that the publicity generated would be advantageous. Locked into a retail battle with rival A.G. Spalding & Bros. for the sale of golf balls, Wanamaker enthusiastically approved the initiative. He asked McNamara to arrange the luncheon inviting prominent amateur and professional golf leaders from throughout the country.

Wanamaker's ninth floor restaurant was chosen as the site for the Monday luncheon, which attracted amateur great Francis Ouimet, noted writer, player and budding architect A.W. Tillinghast; and P.C. Pulver, the New York Evening Sun reporter and one of the first newspaper golf "beat" writers who later served as the first editor of The Professional Golfer, today's PGA Magazine. The guest list also included some of America's top professionals: Alex Smith, James Maiden, Robert White, Jack Mackie and Alex Pirie, as well as others who derived their livelihoods from their jobs at private and public golf facilities.

The Taplow Club was not an eatery or dining establishment. Instead, it was Wanamaker's nickname for his in-store business group. He had taken the name from a palatial estate he leased on Taplow Court some 25 miles outside London. He would later stamp "Taplow" on his store's lower-end, private-label golf balls. Wanamaker, who was not a golfer, was never reported to have attended the luncheon. He delegated the details to McNamara. With golf becoming more and more popular in the U.S., McNamara believed that his fellow professionals could benefit by working together. Wanamaker also believed consolidating professionals would also improve their social standing, having long been treated by club members as second-class citizens.

Toastmaster Joseph H. Appel, vice president of Wanamaker's foundation, presented Wanamaker's offer to conduct a match play championship for professionals, similar to Great Britain's News of the World Tournament. Appel also broached the subject of a national association of professionals.

In addition, Wanamaker would donate a cup and $2,580 in prize money, and would ultimately pay the travel expenses of the competitors. That "cup" became the Rodman Wanamaker Trophy, and the tournament the PGA Championship. The inaugural PGA Championship was held October 10–14, 1916, at Siwanoy Country Club in Bronxville, New York, and won by English-born Jim Barnes.

Former British PGA Secretary James Hepburn suggested that the 32 lowest finishers in the U.S. Open would be paired for match play, following Robert White's contention that the U.S. was too large for section qualifiers. The all-professional match play concept was in direct contrast to the United States Golf Association's medal (stroke) play format. Wanamaker requested that the proposal for the Championship be contingent upon approval by the USGA or other governing bodies.

Tillinghast spoke up and declared that the professionals should be independent of the USGA in handling their own affairs and competitions. Tillinghast's argument held, as a follow-up organizational meeting was planned the following day in Wanamaker's store.

Organizers then formed a seven-person group whose primary task was to define tentative bylaws for the new association. They named Hepburn to chair an organizational committee of professionals that included Maiden, White and Mackie, as well as Gilbert Nicholls, John "Jack" Hobens, and Herbert Strongnone of the group was American-born. This group drafted a constitution, turning to the British PGA for assistance.

The luncheon agenda addressed giving golf professionals say when it came to the organization and staging of tournaments, among other employment issues.

The response to creating such a body was positive, and additional meetings followed. On April 10, 1916, in the second-floor boardroom of the Hotel Martinique on 32nd and Broadway, the Professional Golfers' Association of America was born. There were 78 members elected that day, including 35 PGA Charter Members, of which 28 were born outside the U.S.

The Association began with seven PGA Sections: Metropolitan, Middle States, New England, Southeastern, Central, Northwestern and Pacific. Today, there are 41 PGA Sections nationwide.

From 1934 through November 1961, the PGA of America maintained a "Caucasian-only" membership clause in its bylaws.  The clause was removed by amending its constitution. The previous year, it had voted to retain the clause, and had gained the ire of California Attorney General Stanley Mosk, who threatened to shut down the PGA in the state until the clause was removed. The 1962 PGA Championship was scheduled for Brentwood Country Club in Los Angeles, but the PGA moved it to Philadelphia at Aronimink.

With an increase of revenue in the late 1960s due to expanded television coverage, a dispute arose between the touring professionals and the PGA of America on how to distribute the windfall. The tour players wanted larger purses, where the PGA desired the money to go to the general fund to help grow the game at the local level. Following the final major in July 1968 at the PGA Championship, several leading tour pros voiced their dissatisfaction with the venue and the abundance of club pros in the field. The increased friction resulted in a new entity in August, what would eventually become the PGA Tour. Tournament players formed their own organization, American Professional Golfers, Inc. (APG), independent of the PGA of America. After several months, a compromise was reached in December: the tour players agreed to abolish the APG and form the PGA "Tournament Players Division", a fully autonomous division under the supervision of a new 10-member Tournament Policy Board. The board consisted of four tour players, three PGA of America executives, and three outside members, initially business executives. It hired its own commissioner and was renamed the "PGA Tour" in the mid-1970s.

In October 2014, PGA President Ted Bishop responded to Ian Poulter's criticism of the Ryder Cup captaincy of Nick Faldo and Tom Watson by calling Poulter a "lil' girl", which led to Bishop's firing. The PGA called Bishop's statements "unacceptable" and "insensitive gender-based".

Championships
The PGA conducts annual men's, senior, and women's major championships: the PGA Championship, the Senior PGA Championship, and the Women's PGA Championship (which was renamed from the LPGA Championship in 2015 after a partnership between the LPGA and the PGA of America to heighten the event's profile). All three tournaments feature professional golfers, but their fields also contain slots reserved for club professionals.

The PGA conducts more than 30 tournaments for its members and apprentices, including the PGA Professional Championship and the Assistant PGA Professional Championship. It also co-organizes the biennial Ryder Cup, PGA Cup and in 2019, the inaugural Women's PGA Cup.

Growth of the game
In 2003, the PGA of America created the Player Development department within the Association in an endeavor to reach out to new, past and sporadic adult golfers. This is accomplished through the growth, promotion and support of instructional programs and events at PGA Member facilities that support adults and families to play golf. Included in these programs is Play Golf America, instigated in 2004 with the help of the Allied Associations (LPGA, National Golf Course Owners Association, PGA Tour, USGA, and others involved in the annual Golf 20/20 Conference).

Organization

The PGA is organized into 14 districts and 41 sections.

 District 1
 Northeast New York
 Connecticut
 New England

 District 2

 Metropolitan
 New Jersey
 Philadelphia

 District 3

 Alabama-Northwest Florida
 Gulf States
 Tennessee

 District 4

 Central New York
 Tri-State
 Western New York

 District 5
 Michigan
 Northern Ohio
 Southern Ohio

 District 6
 Illinois
 Indiana
 Wisconsin

 District 7
 Gateway
 Midwest
 South Central

 District 8
 Iowa
 Minnesota
 Nebraska

 District 9
 Colorado
 Rocky Mountain
 Utah

 District 10
 Carolinas
 Kentucky
 Mid-Atlantic

 District 11
 Aloha
 Northern California
 Southern California

 District 12
 Northern Texas
 Southern Texas
 Sun Country

 District 13
 Georgia
 Northern Florida
 Southern Florida

 District 14
 Pacific Northwest
 Southwest

PGA professionals
To be elected to membership of the PGA, aspirant golf professionals (apprentices) and students go through three levels of education courses, written exams, simulation testing, seminars, and must pass the PGA Playing Ability Test. These men and women have the option to pursue the PGA education through self-study, by the use of accredited PGA Golf Management Universities (currently 18 universities in the United States offer a PGA Golf Management program), or through an accelerated PGA Golf Management Program.

PGA Reach
PGA Reach is the charitable foundation of the PGA of America. The mission of PGA Reach is to positively impact the lives of youth, military, and diverse populations by enabling access to PGA professionals, PGA Sections and the game of golf.

PGA presidents

 Asterisk (*) indicates defunct PGA section
 Dixie (**) now the Alabama-Northwest Florida PGA Section

PGA properties

Current 
 PGA Golf Club (Port St. Lucie, Florida) – 54 holes of public-access resort golf designed by Tom Fazio and Pete Dye in PGA Village, which is ranked among the "75 Best Golf Resorts in North America" by Golf Digest (No. 51).
 PGA Center for Golf Learning and Performance (Port St. Lucie, Florida) –  golf park featuring a lighted driving range, short game practice area, and a three-hole teaching course. Ranked among the Top 100 Golf Ranges in America from 1999 to 2011 by Golf Range Magazine.*** sold in 2018 ***
 PGA Gallery – located in the halls of the PGA Golf Club clubhouse in Port St. Lucie, Florida. The PGA Gallery showcases the major trophies in golf, and artifacts of PGA Champions and many rare pieces of PGA history to connect visitors to the rich history of the game and the Association.
 PGA Education Center (Port St. Lucie, Florida) – provides education programs to serve both PGA members and apprentices.

Former 
 Valhalla Golf Club (Louisville, Kentucky) – designed by Jack Nicklaus. Site of the 2008 Ryder Cup; 2004 and 2011 Senior PGA Championships; 2002 PGA Professional National Championship; and 1996, 2000 and 2014 PGA Championships. Ranked No. 95 among "America's 100 Greatest Golf Courses" by Golf Digest. The PGA of America initially bought a 25% interest in 1993, increased it to 50% shortly after the 1996 PGA Championship, and took complete ownership shortly after the 2000 PGA Championship. It sold the club in 2022 to a group of local investors and club members.

See also
 Dewey Brown
 Golf in the United States
 LPGA

References

 – PGA of America History media guide
- PGA Village fact sheet
 – PGA of America fact sheet
- PGA of America History at PGA.com
-PGA history

External links
 
 PGA Village

Professional golf
Golf governing bodies
Golf in the United States
Sports professional associations based in the United States
Sports in Frisco, Texas
Companies based in Frisco, Texas
Sports organizations established in 1916
1916 establishments in the United States